Norah Cecil Runge, OBE (1884 – 6 June 1978) was a Conservative politician in the United Kingdom.

Career 
Runge was elected Member of Parliament for Rotherhithe in the 1931 Conservative landslide, gaining the seat from Labour incumbent Benjamin Smith.  Runge held the seat until 1935, when it was regained by Smith.

She was subsequently created an alderman on London County Council in 1937, remaining a member of the council until 1961.

References

External links 
 
 Parliamentary Archives, Scrapbooks of newspaper clippings charting the career of Norah Cecil Runge, OBE, 1884-1978



1884 births
1978 deaths
Conservative Party (UK) MPs for English constituencies
UK MPs 1931–1935
Female members of the Parliament of the United Kingdom for English constituencies
Officers of the Order of the British Empire
Politics of the London Borough of Southwark
Members of London County Council
20th-century British women politicians
20th-century English women
20th-century English people
Women councillors in England